Lactifluus pagodicystidiatus is a species of mushroom in the family Russulaceae. It was described by Luke Vaughan, Lachlan Tegart, and James K. Douch in 2021. The specific epithet refers to the presence of some cystidia with shapes resembling a pagoda. The type locality is near the summit of Mount Jersey, Australia.

See also 
 
 List of Lactifluus species
 Fungi of Australia

References

External links 
 

Fungi described in 2021
Fungi of Australia
Lactifluus